Åsmund Lønning Strømnes (14 October 1927 – 3 December 2009) was a Norwegian educationalist.

He was born in Trondenes, and graduated from Volda Teacher's College in 1951. He worked ten years as a teacher before enrolling at the University of Oslo. He has a Doctor of Philosophy degree from the University of Oslo (1968), and worked as a docent there from 1970 to 1973. He was a professor at the University of Tromsø from 1973 to 1985 and at the University of Trondheim (from 1996: Norwegian University of Science and Technology) from 1985 to 1997. He was a dean during his time in Tromsø. He was given the honorary degree at Uppsala University in 2007, and was a fellow of the Royal Norwegian Society of Sciences and Letters. From 1985 to 2008 he edited the Scandinavian Journal of Educational Research.

Strømnes was a co-founder of the Norwegian Social Science Data Services, and was its first chairman of the board from 1971 to 1974. He has also been a member of the council NAVF. After retiring, he moved to Eidsvoll where he worked with local history. He died on 3 December 2009.

References

1927 births
2009 deaths
People from Harstad
People from Eidsvoll
Norwegian educators
Volda University College alumni
University of Oslo alumni
Academic staff of the University of Oslo
Academic staff of the University of Tromsø
Academic staff of the Norwegian University of Science and Technology
Royal Norwegian Society of Sciences and Letters